The Barry Arm landslide is an ongoing landslide in the Barry Arm fjord, northeast of Whittier, Alaska. The landslide is currently sliding into the waters of the fjord. Recently discovered in 2020, scientists fear that the slope may trigger a large tsunami when it falls into the fjord.

Description
It existed as far back as in the 1920s based on photographic evidence.

Satellite data and imagery indicate the large part of the landslide directly above the fjord waters began sliding on August 23, 2022. The slide is currently moving at a rate of  each day. However, the volume of the landslide remains undetermined because the depth is uncertain. Similar movement were recorded since 2008 and 2020. However, the recent movement is at least twice as fast and occurring over a greater area. The landslide consists of four parts (north to south: Tail, Core, Prow, Kite). In September 2022, movement was detected in large parts of "Core" and "Prow" as well as the entire "Kite" section.

Tsunami hazard
The persistent movement of the landslide at a constant or increased rate would raise the likelihood for failure. In a worst-case scenario, rapid ground failure could result in a deadly tsunami in large water bodies including Harriman Fiord, Barry Arm, College Fiord, Port Wells, Cochrane Bay, Blackstone Bay, and Passage Canal. Scientists said that the tsunami could be fatal to people in the vicinity of the landslide.

According to an interdisciplinary team of researchers in 2020, if the landslide were to fail all at once, a peak run-up of  would occur. Meanwhile run-ups of  would be widely observed around the immediate area. Turbidity currents may be triggered by the landslide or tsunami, potentially damaging two submarine cables in the sound. Remaining oil in sediments from the Exxon Valdez oil spill could be remobilized and impact the natural environment. A  tsunami would strike Whittier within 20 minutes of the landslide occurring. The tsunami heights is similar to that of the 1964 Alaska earthquake when it struck the city.

In this separate scenario, the tsunami would exceed  in the northern part of the fjord. The simulation used data from bathymetric maps by the National Oceanic and Atmospheric Administration and lidar imaging from the Alaska Division of Geological and Geophysical Surveys. The U.S. Geological Survey said that the tsunami hazard is not as severe as initially thought but still pose a threat to coastal settlements.

References

External links
Barry Arm landslide and tsunami information City of Whittier, Alaska
Barry Arm Landslide and Tsunami Hazard Alaska Division of Geological & Geophysical Surveys
Barry Arm, Alaska Landslide and Tsunami Monitoring United States Geological Survey

Landslides in the United States
Kenai Mountains-Turnagain Arm National Heritage Area
Landslides in 2022
Landslides in 2010
Landslides in 2013
Tsunamis in the United States
Geology of Alaska
Megatsunami